(stylized as milet) is a Japanese singer signed to SMEJ. She made her major debut in 2019 with Inside You EP. The EP peaked at number 16 on the Oricon Albums Chart. After releasing five EPs, she released first studio album Eyes in 2020. The album hit number one on both Oricon and Japan's Billboard chart, certified Gold by the Recording Industry Association of Japan for sales of 100,000.

Career
milet is a Japanese singer-songwriter who spent her youth in Canada and is currently residing in Tokyo to pursue her musical career. She started her career in 2018.

On March 6, 2019, her first live show, Milet Special Show Case @Billboard-Live Tokyo, was held at Billboard Live Tokyo. In that same year, several of her songs were featured in various media. Her songs "Us" and "Again and Again" were used as the openings for Japanese TV dramas Gisou Furin and Joker x Face respectively, while her songs "Drown", "Prover" and "Tell me" were used as the second ending for the anime adaptation of Vinland Saga and the second ending of anime series Fate/Grand Order - Absolute Demonic Front: Babylonia, respectively.

On June 3, 2020, Milet released her debut album Eyes, which hit number one on Oricon Albums Chart. She collaborated on the album with guitarist Toru of One OK Rock and Man with a Mission member Kamikaze Boy.

Starting from October 4, 2020, Milet became a DJ host for the radio series Music Freaks, streaming every Sunday from 22:00 to 24:00 (JST) on the Osaka radio station FM802 from a studio in Minami-morimachi. The radio broadcasts are stated to last one year.

Her single "Ordinary Days" was used as the ending theme for the live-action drama adaptation of Police in a Pod, which aired from July 7 to September 15, 2021.

On November 12, 2020, the song "Who I Am" premiered on YouTube and was subsequently featured as the title track of her sixth mini-album, which released on December 2, 2020. "Who I Am" and the song "The Hardest" were both respectively used as the opening and ending themes of the Japanese television drama Shichinin no Hisho.

Milet debut in the popular annual TV music show, 71st NHK Kōhaku Uta Gassen, on 31 December 2020 with the song "Inside You".

On August 8, 2021, she performed at the closing ceremony of the 2020 Tokyo Olympics. She covered the song "Hymne à l'amour", originally sung by Edith Piaf. On November 18, 2021, she represented Japan in the 10th Asia-Pacific Broadcasting Union (ABU) TV Song Festival, performing her first big hit "Inside You" remotely. On December 31, 2021, she participated in the "NHK Kōhaku Uta Gassen" for the second consecutive year, performing "Fly High."

On April 22, 2022, Milet released a teaser lyric video for a new single entitled "Walkin' in My Lane", which serves as the theme song to the live-action drama adaptation of the manga Yangotonaki Ichizoku. It was pre-released on streaming services on April 29, and was fully released on May 25, 2022, along with "Love When I Cry" and "My Dreams Are Made of Hell."

Discography

Studio albums

Extended plays

Singles

As lead artist

As featured artist

Promotional singles

Other charted songs

Awards

References

External links
 
  (SME Records)
  (Sony Music Artists)
 

Living people
Japanese women singer-songwriters
English-language singers from Japan
21st-century Japanese women singers
Sony Music Entertainment Japan artists
Year of birth missing (living people)